Stab-Lok is a brand name of electrical circuit breakers that were manufactured primarily by Federal Pacific Electric between 1950-1980.
In June 1980, Reliance Electric, which had purchased FPE, reported to the United States Consumer Product Safety Commission 
that "many FPE circuit breakers did not fully comply with Underwriters Laboratories, Inc. (UL) requirements. Commission testing confirmed that these breakers fail certain UL calibration test requirements."
Professional home inspectors now routinely recommend removing and replacing Stab-Lok breakers and panels that remain in service, as they may pose a fire hazard.

Safety issues
It has been widely reported in news media and online that Stab-Lok circuit breakers, and panels, do not meet the requirements of the National Electrical Code (NFPA 70) and Underwriters Laboratories, and should be replaced. 

According to a 2012 news report by NBC Bay Area (KNTV):

According to an independent analysis performed by Jesse Aronson, P.E.:

According to ANGI Homeservices, formerly known as Angie's List,

Angie's List and NBC Bay Area both highlighted an October 2002 ruling in a New Jersey Superior Court, which found that FPE (Federal Pacific Electric), the manufacturer of the Stab-Lok breakers and panels, "knowingly and purposefully [sic] distributed circuit breakers which were not tested to meet UL standards as indicated on their label".

Government response 
After the 1979 sale of Federal Pacific Electric to Reliance Electric, a unit of Exxon Corporation, Reliance reported to the U.S. Consumer Product Safety Commission that the Stab-Lok breakers and panels did not meet the requirements published by Underwriters Laboratories, even though the products bore UL markings.
The CPSC performed its own testing and concluded:

After a two-year investigation into whether these test failures would create a "serious risk of injury to consumers", the CPSC closed the investigation, citing a lack of budget to continue:

CPSC urged consumers to remain vigilant and report any failed breakers or equipment so it could continue to collect data.

Fate 

The Stab-Lok brand was discontinued, and its maker, FPE, went through a succession of later owners: Reliance Electric, owned by Exxon, in 1979; Exxon later sold Reliance Electric to Rockwell, which sold the business to Baldor Electric in 2006.  Baldor was bought by ABB in 2011.

Other companies began building Stab-Lok style breakers through around 1990. According to a Washington Post article, home inspection professionals now routinely advise consumers to remove and replace those panels that remain in service.

According to Home Inspection Insider, when Dr. Jesse Aronstein tested the Schneider Electric and Connecticut Electric replacement breakers, he found they had problems with failure rates, indicating that replacement breakers are no better than original Stab-Lok breakers. 

In his report, Dr. Aronstein states

Providers 

Other manufacturers of Stab-Lok breakers may have included:

 American Circuit Breaker Corporation
 Challenger
 Thomas & Betts
 Connecticut Electric - Unique Breakers Inc. (UBI)

References 

Electricity
Electrical_wiring_and_construction_supplies_manufacturers
Product_safety_scandals
Fire_prevention